Dobiegniew  is a town in western Poland, in Lubusz Voivodeship, in Strzelce-Drezdenko County. As of December 2021, the town has 3,004 inhabitants.

History

The area formed part of Greater Poland in Piast-ruled Poland. The settlement was mentioned in 1250, when Duke Przemysł I of Greater Poland granted it to Cistercians from Owińska. In 1280 it was mentioned under the Latinized name villa Dobegneve in a document of Przemysł II of Poland. It was granted town rights in 1298.

In 1333 the town's name is mentioned as „Waldinborg“. In 1373, along with the region it became part of the Czech Crown Lands, ruled by the Luxembourg dynasty. In 1402, the Luxembourgs reached an agreement with Poland in Kraków, according to which Poland was to purchase and re-incorporate the region, but eventually the Luxembourgs sold it to the Teutonic Order. It was captured by joint Polish-Czech forces in 1433, during the Polish–Teutonic War (1431–1435). When another Polish-Teutonic war broke out in 1454, the Teutonic Knights sold the region to the Margraviate of Brandenburg in order to raise funds for war. The prosperity of the town came from agriculture, clothmaking and trade. It was located on the trade route connecting Poznań and Szczecin, and despite its annexation from Poland, it still had strong ties with Greater Poland. After the Thirty Years' War (1618–1648) many Poles settled in the town, and until 1660 local merchants were exempt from tariffs in trade with Poland. From the 18th century it was part of the Kingdom of Prussia and from 1871 also Germany, until 1945.

During World War II, the Oflag II-C German POW camp was located nearby (today within the city limits). The camp housed Polish officers. Today it houses the Muzeum Woldenberczyków, which is dedicated to the history of the prisoners. The Germans also established a prison for foreigners, mostly Poles, accused of wanting to escape from forced labor. In the final stages of World War II, the town was heavily destroyed and finally captured in January 1945. Subsequently, the town became again part of Poland and its historic name Dobiegniew was restored.

Twin towns – sister cities
See twin towns of Gmina Dobiegniew.

References

External links

Official town website
Jewish Community in Dobiegniew on Virtual Shtetl

Cities and towns in Lubusz Voivodeship
Strzelce-Drezdenko County